Lakes in, or bordered by, Chad include:

 Lake Chad
 Lake Fianga
 Lake Fitri
 Lake Iro
 Lake Katam
 Tibesti Soda Lake
 Lake Yoa
 Lake Tréné
 Léré Lake

See also

Sources 

Chad
Lakes